Molus may refer to:

 Molus, a gossamer-winged butterfly genus now included in Thereus
Molus, Kentucky, an unincorporated community in Harlan County
 Molus (mythology), the name of three characters in Greek mythology

See also

Molus River (disambiguation)